Mirond Lake is a lake in Saskatchewan, Canada. It lies in low-relief forested terrain of the Canadian Shield. The climate is sub-arctic.

Location

The lake is accessible by road north from the Hanson Lake Road (Saskatchewan Highway 106).
Mirond Lake is joined to Pelican Lake to the west by a narrow stretch of water that gives its name to the community of Pelican Narrows on its north shore.
Attitti Lake to the east drains through Waskwei Lake and Wunehikun Bay into Mirond Lake.

Mirond lake is the headwaters of the Sturgeon-Weir River, a tributary to Cumberland Lake.
This in turn drains into the Saskatchewan River System.
The Sturgeon-Wier leaves the end of the lake through a rock-walled channel containing a section of rapids, then flows more slowly through a series of long, narrow lakes.
The river drains a large system of lakes between latitudes 54°30' and 55°30' and longitudes 102° and 103°, including Deschambault Lake, Wood Lake, Pelican Lake and Mirond Lake. 

Etymology

The name "mi-rond" is French and means "half round", or "half moon" according to Sir John Richardson.
It describes the shape of the lake.
Peter Pond, a poor speller, showed the lake as "Mineront" in his maps drawn around 1785.
Other variants were used later, such as Merion.
Sir John Franklin on his overland expedition of 1819-22 wrote "Miron" as "Heron", and this was copied by several other map makers.
The name Mirond is standard now.
The Cree give the twin lakes of Pelican and Mirond the name Opawikoschikun Sakuhikuna, or "fear lakes", referring to a massacre that took place there around 1730.
The Cree name for the narrows is Opawikoscikcan, meaning "fear narrows".

Climate

The lake is in the subarctic climate zone.

Environment

The landscape has areas of glaciolacustrine silts and clays or sandy glacial till, with many outcrops of Precambrian rocks that have been scoured by glacial ice.
There are large areas of peatland in the poorly drained areas, and elsewhere the land is forested.
Black spruce (picea mariana) is common but not dominant, and other trees include white spruce (picea glauca), trembling aspen (populus tremuloides), jack pine (pinus banksiana) and balsam fir (abies balsamea).
The lake has lodges with cabins and campgrounds for fishing and hunting.
A Saskatchewan live release record for northern pike was set at Mirond Lake in 2008, with a  specimen.

See also
List of lakes of Saskatchewan

Notes

Sources

Lakes of Saskatchewan